Just like Magic may refer to:

Just like Magic, a 1991 album by Special EFX
Just like Magic, a 2009 album by Donnie Williams
"Just like Magic", a 2016 song by Casey Barnes
"Just like Magic", a song by Ariana Grande from the album Positions (album), 2020